is a Japanese manga series written and illustrated by Nami Sano. The manga follows a high school student named Sakamoto, who has a reputation for being the "coolest" person among the entire student body. The series has been licensed for an English release by Seven Seas Entertainment. An anime television adaptation produced by Studio Deen aired between April 8 to July 5, 2016.

Plot
The story is centered around the incredibly popular Sakamoto: a flawless boy genius who is well liked by every student and the school faculty (except Kakuta) in the high school for his coolness. Despite the strange situations he may find himself in, normally consisting of pranks set up by the envious male population of the school, Sakamoto always manages to emerge in absolute perfection and as a result makes himself seem even cooler.

Characters

 
The protagonist of the series who is a model student for all the other students in his school. He is the perfect man who can solve any problem with a kind, yet unflappable persona. Because of this, many girls fall for him, and some of his male classmates resent him (just a few only). Although he acts strangely sometimes (such as doing weird poses or acting sneakily), it only adds to his coolness. Sakamoto has a range of 'secret skills' which allow him to do various things, such as catch bugs or blow bubbles.

He is often oblivious to the dangers around him and, according to Yanoashinobu, he accepts most things as being normal. He is often oblivious to people's feelings as well, though once he realized the other party's feelings, he will do something to make them happy, or ease their worries.

His first name is never told; once, Aina tries to find his name, but each time she locates it around the classroom, it is obscured behind something. When she asks him about his first name, despite the fact that he said it, no one can hear it due to noise, making her suspect that he is banned from saying it on-air.

Following the graduation of the third year students, Sakamoto announced to his classmates that he will be moving to America to pursue his dream as an astronaut. At the same time, he was met with multiple cream pie attacks by his fellow classmates and teacher as a sign of heartwarming departure.

A student who was being bullied for money until Sakamoto helped him get a part-time job at McDoodle's (a parody of McDonald's that is known as WcDonalds in the anime). Kubota managed to stand up for himself in dealing with the bullies, and now hangs out with Sakamoto. Like Sakamoto, he has 'secret skills', though they are all related to fast food. He cares for his hair so much, that when Hayabusa's underclassmen shaves all of his hair until he goes bald, he cries and stays in his room, not wanting to see anyone. He is also seen bringing hair care equipment to school. Likewise with other students, Kubota joins them in a cream pie attack against Sakamoto before he moved to America.

Nicknamed "Acchan". Sakamoto's former bully, and one of a three-member delinquent group. After being bested by Sakamoto, Acchan no longer smokes, instead choosing to blow bubbles. He harbors both resentment and admiration to Sakamoto and during the third year students' graduation ceremony, he was manipulated into attacking Sakamoto while he delivered a speech. Eventually, he gives up and voiced his jealousy towards Sakamoto and the latter cover up his attack as a part of his speech, saving him from disciplinary punishments. After Sakamoto announced his departure to America, Atsushi announced his dream to study harder and surpass Sakamoto while trying to throw a cream pie at the former before he evades.

The one with a high short ponytail in the three-member delinquent group together with Atsushi/Acchan.

The golden-haired one in the three-member delinquent group together with Atsushi/Acchan.

A male student who is in the same class as Sakamoto. He disliked him for always stealing the class' attention. Sera was a teenage model until an incident involving Sakamoto and a wasp, and now is a class clown who makes bee jokes. After Sakamoto announced his departure to America, Sera announced his dream to become Japan's top comedian while trying to throw a cream pie at the former before he evades.

A female student in Sakamoto's class who falls for him. She is very popular among boys but has no interest for anyone else except Sakamoto, which makes her disliked by other girls. She charms the boys to do her bidding by making them fall in love with her through 'love lessons', which turned out to be totally invalid to Sakamoto. After Sakamoto announced his departure to America, Aina announced her dream to become Japan's top model and win Sakamoto's affection while trying to throw a cream pie at the former before he evades.

A female student and the class representative in Sakamoto's class. She is fond of taking the photographs of Sakamoto. Her friends call her Fu-chan.

A female student who belongs to Megumi's circle of friends. Her brown hair is styled into a twintail.

A female student who belongs to Megumi's circle of friends. She wears a red-frame spectacle.

A female student who belongs to Aina's circle of friends. She has a dark-blue hair.

A female student who belongs to Aina's circle of friends. She has a blonde hair.

A female student with a short light brown hair. She appears to be a bit tomboyish. Her mother is named Keiko.

A dark-skinned man who is Class 1-2's Physical and Health Education teacher. He resents Sakamoto for his act of coming to school exactly on time before the bell rings, and by sliding in between his legs. His hair has a straight cut so perfect that it can be used as a substitute for a ruler.

Yoshinobu's mother, who falls for Sakamoto since she meets him, as he resembles Chon Choriso.

A Korean idol (in the fictional world of this work), of whom Shigemi is a fan. Sakamoto's appearance is close to Chon, which partially explains why she falls for the former.

 A delinquent in grade 2 who once used Sakamoto as his errand boy, but Sakamoto's seemingly considerate "service" finally overwhelms him.

 A delinquent in year 2 who is regarded as a model by other delinquents. He is handsome and smart, and, unlike most delinquents, he respects honor. He manages to drag Sakamoto into a duel with him, but is finally moved by Sakamoto. He is currently aligned to Sakamoto after long-time delinquent Fukase damaged his noseline during the cultural festival. It reveals that he is the eldest brother who showed concern on his siblings and his estranged father. Hayabusa was the last person that Sakamoto met before he left for America and the former suspected his reason of departure as a lie despite Sakamoto denied it as such.

 A long-time delinquent who is in 30s, has an IQ of 180 and had a strange past. He is popular among delinquents due to his tendency of targeting popular students while manipulating others to do his dirty work. He harbors interest to Sakamoto and decides to play a "game" with him in throwing him out in school during the cultural festival which he is unsuccessful. During the graduation ceremony for the third graders, Fukase manipulates Acchan into attacking Sakamoto but once this fails, he was bested by Sakamoto and the whole school's delinquents into his own graduation. Finally moved on by Sakamoto, he was never to be shown at the school ever since and is currently working as a surfer at a nearby beach.

Media
The series debuted in 2011, before beginning regular serialization in Enterbrain's Fellows! magazine (renamed as harta magazine in February 2013) on April 14, 2012. The series ended its serialization on December 14, 2015.

The series is licensed in North America by Seven Seas Entertainment, who released the first volume in August 2015.

Volumes
The series was collected into four tankōbon volumes.

Anime
It was announced in the final volume of the manga that the series will get an anime television adaptation that aired between April 8, 2016 and July 1, 2016 in Japan on TBS and later on CBC, MBS, BS-TBS and TBS Channel 1, and was simulcast by Crunchyroll. The anime was animated by Studio Deen and written and directed by Shinji Takamatsu, with music composed by Yasuhiko Fukuda, character designs by Atsuko Nakajima and art direction by Masatoshi Muto.

Following a one-week delay due to coverage of the 2016 earthquake in Kumamoto, the thirteenth episode was not aired as part of the television broadcast. The episode was later streamed by Crunchyroll on September 27, 2016 and will be included with the series' fifth Blu-ray/DVD volume on October 26, 2016.

Sentai Filmworks licensed the series for release in North America.

Episode list

Reception
It won the 2013 Comic Natalie Grand Prize. Volume 1 was also number one on the Book of the Year list of Male-Oriented Comics from January to June, 2013 by Da Vinci magazine.

As of November 24, 2013, volume 1 has sold 930,716 copies and volume 2, 397,213. Volume 1 was the 19th best-selling manga volume in the period of November 19, 2012 to May 19, 2013 and the 27th from November 19, 2012 to November 17, 2013. Volume 2 reached the number one place on the Oricon weekly manga chart in the week of November 11 to 17, 2013. Volume 3 has sold 626,823 copies as of January 18, 2015.

Notes

References

External links
 at Seven Seas Entertainment
Haven't You Heard? I'm Sakamoto (anime) at TBS 

Crunchyroll Anime Awards winners
Enterbrain manga
Kadokawa Dwango franchises
School life in anime and manga
Seinen manga
Sentai Filmworks
Seven Seas Entertainment titles
Studio Deen
TBS Television (Japan) original programming
Juvenile delinquency in fiction
Surreal comedy anime and manga